Battersea is a district of the city of London. It may also refer to:

Battersea (UK Parliament constituency)
Metropolitan Borough of Battersea, a civil parish and borough of the County of London
Battersea Power Station, a decommissioned power generation station in London
Battersea, Ontario, Canada, a community
Battersea (Prairieville, Alabama), a plantation house on the National Register of Historic Places 
Battersea (Petersburg, Virginia), a historic house
Battersea (EP), by the Belgian band Hooverphonic
Battersea, a rescue center for dogs and cats